Callaqui is a stratovolcano located in the Bío Bío Region of Chile.  It is a large ice-capped, basaltic andesite volcano which is elongated in the northeast-southwest direction, due to its construction  along an 11 km (7 mi) long fissure.  Numerous cinder cones and lava flows have erupted from vents along this linear fissure.  Most of the activity at Callaqui has been fumarolic.  Minor eruptions were reported 1751, 1864, and 1937, and the latest eruption was a small phreatic eruption in 1980.

Together with Hekla in Iceland, Callaqui is one of the few volcanoes with have a morphology between a crater row and stratovolcano (built from mixed lava and tephra eruptions).

The volcano is the centerpiece of Ralco National Reserve.

See also 
 List of volcanoes in Chile

References

Bibliography 
  (in Spanish; also includes volcanoes of Argentina, Bolivia, and Peru)
 
 

Mountains of Chile
Stratovolcanoes of Chile
Active volcanoes
Volcanoes of Biobío Region
Three-thousanders of the Andes
Pleistocene stratovolcanoes
Holocene stratovolcanoes